Herscher High School is a public coeducational high school in Herscher, Illinois, United States.

The school's mascot is the Tiger and the school colors are gold and black.

History
Herscher High School's first graduating class in 1904 numbered seven students.

Athletics
Herscher is a member of the Illinois Central Eight Conference and participates in state tournaments sponsored by the Illinois High School Association.

The school sponsors interscholastic sports teams for both men and women in basketball, bowling, cross country, soccer, and track and field. The school sponsors baseball, football, and wrestling for men, while sponsoring cheerleading, softball, and volleyball for women.

The following teams have placed in the top four of their respective state tournament sponsored by the Illinois High School Association:
Men's Baseball – State Champion (1999); 3rd place (2012) 
Men's Basketball – 3rd place (1981–1982)
Men's Cross Country – 4th place (1986–1987)
Men's Football – 2nd place (1988–1989)
Men's Soccer – 2nd place (2013) 3rd place (2014)
Women's Cross Country – 3rd place (1989–1990, 1997–1998); State Champion (1991–1992, 1992–1993, 1996–1997); 4th place (1993–1994, 1995–1996)
Women's Soccer – 4th place (2007–2008) 2nd place (2010–11)
Women's Softball – 4th place (1995–1996)
Women's Track and Field – State Champion (1996)

Music
Herscher High School sponsors the following musical activities: chamber choir, colorguard, concert band, concert choir, jazz band, marching band, orchestra, pep band, and show choir.

The school's music program has won the Illinois High School Association Music Sweepstakes title a record 32 times. This record is more than any other school, outpacing its nearest competitor by at least double as of the 2009–2010 school year. They compete in class B. In 1982, the marching band won the overall title for the Bands Of America (then known as Marching Bands Of America) Summer National Championship. The Marching Tigers have also won the overall title of the Illinois State University Invitational Marching Band Championship three times (1980, 1981 and 1982).

Other activities
The school also sponsors a computer club, class plays, FFA, a math team, National Honor Society, a scholastic bowl team, a Spanish club, a speech team, and student council.

Notable alumni
Kerry Schall, competed on the reality show The Ultimate Fighter 2, retired professional MMA fighter.
Steve Reick, Illinois Representative for the 63rd District.
Helen Nethercutt, autism activist and businesswoman.
Travis Richards, businessman.

References

External links
 
 Herscher High School Alumni Association
 Illinois High School Association, Herscher

Educational institutions in the United States with year of establishment missing
Public high schools in Illinois
Schools in Kankakee County, Illinois